Belfast railway station may refer to:

 Belfast Central railway station in Belfast, Northern Ireland, United Kingdom
 Belfast Great Victoria Street railway station in Belfast, Northern Ireland, United Kingdom
 Queen's Quay railway station on the former Belfast and County Down Railway in Belfast, Northern Ireland, United Kingdom